Walke may refer to:

Military destroyers
 USS Walke
 USS Walke (DD-34), a 1910 Paulding-class destroyer
 USS Walke (DD-416), a Sims-class destroyer
 USS Walke (DD-723), an Allen M. Sumner-class destroyer
 USS Walke incident, naval blockade from 1951 to 1953, during the Korean War

People
 Alexander Walke (born 1983), German professional football goalkeeper
 Annie Walke (1888–1965), Newlyn School artist and wife of Bernard Walke
 Bernard Walke (1874–1941), Anglican priest
 Henry A. Walke (1809–1896), United States Navy Officer
 Bernhard Walke (born 1940), pioneer of mobile Internet access and professor emeritus
 Collin Walke (born 1982), American politician
 Olive Walke (1911–1969), Trinidadian musician and ethnomusicologist

Places
 Walke Manor House, neighborhood of Old Donation Farm, Virginia Beach, Virginia
 Anthony and Susan Cardinal Walke House, residence in Chillicothe, Ohio, United States
 Swinley Walke, Crown Estate woodland in Berkshire, England

See also 
 Walske